Ivan Ivanović (born October 17, 1981), known by his stage name Juice ( / Đus), is a Serbian rapper and founding member of Full Moon Crew and 93 FU Crew. He is one of the major figures in the Serbian hip hop scene.

Music career
In the early 1990s he started listening to domestic hip-hop. Soon, his eagerness to make his own songs made him go with a demo hip-hop group Boyz in tha Hood, which had three members (Beli (Dragan Guteša), Sale (Saša Mićović), Juice (Ivan Ivanović)). They have released track Generacije Geta and Jump, Boom, Slam, they had success with it on the radio hip-hop show Geto. After releasing another song titled No more Games, Juice leaves the band and forms Full Moon, which consisted Goran, Miša and Juice. Shorty joined the band later. After a while, Shorty and Juice were the only members left. After releasing a couple of songs, Juice hits Ponjke and Marko from Belgrade Posse and with their help a hit song Razmisli was played twice in a row on Geto. Razmisli was 4th place at 1995 charts.

Full Moon and Monteniggers met on a basketball tournament and Full Moon appeared on Monteniggers' video for Ducka Diesel. Shortly after their debut album in 1998, Juice and Shorty presented an underground hip-hop sound and reached an even larger crowd of fans. They also made a great success with the single Ja se vraćam u svoj Hram, which is considered first drum & bass song in Serbia at the time. After a tour through the whole Serbia, they accompanied Gru and they appeared together.
1999 was a break because of NATO bombing. Nine months after the Full Moon was back on stage for a successful concert at Dom Omladine and a new video for the song I kada Znam.

He released his first solo album Hiphopium in 2002 on BK Sound. With the releasing of the album he made a rap collective called 93 FU Crew. Video for his hit song Keš Kolica was on top of video charts and had influence on future young rappers. Keš Kolica also became a slang phrase used by young people. Juice also made Redaljke in which he dissed other rappers from the scene, such as Gru, Bad Copy and Marchelo. After a while, Juice apologized to the members of Bad Copy. His second solo album Brate Minli was released in 2006, while his third album Hiphopium 2 was released in 2008. Both albums were released on City Records. In 2012 he dropped his fourth album called Apetiti mi rastu which was significant in developing trap music direction in Serbia, and the rest of the Balkans as well. In May 2015 Juice signed a contract with IDJTunes and dropped his fifth album Hiphopium 3. There are 23 tracks on the album including intro and outro, with very few features from other rappers and singers. and few producers as well. Short after that he dropped a music video for single Mira Škorić which was produced by young music producer Unik (also goes by Datz Unik). Juice has done voice work for the Serbian dub of Madagascar: Escape 2 Africa, voicing the character Moto Moto.

He has his own clothing brand, 93 FUKRU, and several stores.

Reality TV
In 2010, he participated in Farma, however, he was disqualified after feuding with Miloš Bojanić.
He won the first season of the reality TV show Dvor, in 2011, winning the prize of 50,000 €, and an extra 10,000 €.

Personal life
Juice was assaulted in 2010, after leaving the Farma.

Discography

Albums 
 1998: Na Nivou (with Full Moon)
 2002: Hiphopium
 2006: Brate Minli
 2008: Hiphopium 2
 2012: Apetiti mi rastu
 2015: Hiphopium 3
 2017: Od blata do zlata
 2020: Hiphopium 4

References

External links
 Official myspace site

1981 births
Living people
Musicians from Belgrade
Serbian rappers
21st-century Serbian male singers
Serbian hip hop musicians